Kazem HajirAzad (born March 21, 1950) is an Iranian cinema, television, and stage actor. He is a member of I.F.A.A (Iranian Film Actors Association) and Iranian actors of Theater Forum and also the Theater Forum executive committee.

Education
Kazem HajirAzad studied acting under Mostafa Oskooyi (Konstantin Stanislavski's 'system') at the Anahita studio.

Plays

 Rostam and Sohrāb by Abolqasem Ferdowsi directed by Mostafa Oskooyi 1970
 Haiti by W. E. B. Du Bois directed by Mostafa Oskooyi 1979
 Avicenna (Abu Ali ibn Sina) by Enayatolah Ehsani directed by Mostafa Oskooyi 1980
 Sousangerd directed by Mehdi Fat'hi 1981
 Blue Light Operation directed by Mostafa Oskooyi 1981
 Yerma by Federico García Lorca directed by Mehdi Arjomand 1988
 Deep are the Roots by Arnaud d'Usseau and James Gow directed by Masoume Taghipour 1989
 Death In Autumn (Marg Dar Paiz) by Akbar Radi directed by Mohammad Banaie 1991
 Hamlet by William Shakespeare directed by Ghotbeddin Sadeghi 1992
 Victory In Chicago (Pirouzi Dar Shikago) directed by Davood Rashidi 1992
 Memory Of Sand Years (Yadegare Salhaye Shen) by Ali Rafie directed by Ali Rafie 1992
 Seagull by Anton Chekhov directed by Akbar Zanjanpoor 1996
 Milky Way (Kakeshane Rahe Shiri) by Karl Wittlinger directed by Reza Abdolalizade 1998
 The Postman by Antonio Skarmeta directed by Alireza Koushk Jalali 1999
 Golden Tooth (Dandoon Tala) by Davoud MirBagheri directed by Fareed Sajadi Hoseyni 2001
 Poor Bitos by Jean Anouilh directed by Hamid Mozafari 2002
 Afshin & Boodalaf Are Both Dead by Ghotbeddin Sadeghi  directed by Ghotbeddin Sadeghi 2003
 The Just Assassins by Albert Camus directed by Ghotbeddin Sadeghi 2005
 An Enemy of the People  (Doshmane mardom ) directed by Akbar Zanjanpoor 2006
 Rostam va sohrab by Abolqasem Ferdowsi directed by Rasoul Najafian 2006
 The Wild Duck by Henrik Ibsen directed by  Nader Borhani Marand 2007
 Memorial of Zariran by Ghotbeddin Sadeghi directed by Ghotbeddin Sadeghi 2008
 God of Carnage by Yasmina Reza directed by Alireza Koushk Jalali 2008 – 2009
 Antigone (Sophocles) by Sophocles directed by Hooshmand Honarkar 2009
 Baghe ShekarPare by Ghotbeddin Sadeghi directed by Ghotbeddin Sadeghi 2009
  Maghame Asheghi by Babak Safikhani directed by Mohamad Hatami 2010

Filmography
 Cargo directed by Cyrus Alvand 1987
 The Snobs (Tohfe-ha) directed by Ebrahim Vahidzade 1988
 Statue (Mojasame) directed by Ebrahim Vahidzade 1992
 Ghafele directed by Majid Javanmard 1992
 The Abadanis directed by Kianoush Ayyari 1993
 Shahin Talai directed by Salehe Mirzaie 1993
 Nish directed by Homayuon Asaadiyan 1993
 Hadaf directed by Bahram Kazemi 1994
 Aghrab directed by Behrouz Afkhami 1995
 Gerogan directed by Asghar Hashemi 1996
 Shabe Roubah directed by Homayoun Asaadiyan 1996
 Leaning on the Wind (Takye Bar Bad) directed by Dariush Farhang 2000
 Traveler of Rey (Mosfere Rey) directed by Davood MirBagheri 2001
 Silent King (Shahe Khamoush) directed by Homayoun Shahnavaz 2002
 Father (Pedar) directed by Shahram Shah Mohammadi 2004
 In the Name of Father (Be Nam-e Pedar) directed by Ebrahim Hatamikia 2005
 The Death Story of Sohrab directed by Farshad Ahmadi Dastgerdi 2017

Television series and tele theaters

 The Barber of Seville (tele theater) directed by Mostafa Oskooyi 1971
 Rostam and Sohrāb (tele theater) directed by Mostafa Oskooyi 1971
 Havaye Taze (tele film) directed by Alaedin Rahimi 1985
 Saye-e Hamsaye (series) directed by Esmaeel Khalaj 1985
 Delavaran Kazba (tele theater) directed by Jamshid Jahanzade 1988
 My Heart's in the Highlands (Ghalbe Man Dar Kohsaran) (tele theater) directed by Ahmad Ashraf Abadi 1988
 Azan Bi Vaght (tele theater) directed by Jamshid Jahanzade 1988
 Hekayat Ghabusname (tele theater) directed by NadAli Hamedani 1988
 Variyeteye American (series) directed by Mohamad Rahmanian 1990
 Dahomin Mazloom (tele theater) directed by Alaedin Rahimi 1990
 Medali Baraye Vili (tele theater) directed by Javid Mohtadi 1991
 Ayene (series) directed by Ferydoon Farhoodi 1991
 Estepan (tele theater) directed by Javid Mohtadi 1993
 Tanze Shabane (series) directed by Mohamad Rahmanian
 Tanhatarin Sardar (series) directed by Mehdi Fakhimzade 1994
 Shahedi Baraye Bazporsi (tele theater) directed by Hassan Fathi 1995
 Chahar Fasl (tele film) directed by Majid Shahsavari 1995
 Vocalaye Javan (series) directed by Bahram Kazemi 1995
 In Another Land Dar Sarzamini Digar (series) directed by Majid Javanmard 1996
 Dovomin Enfejar (series) directed by Nader Moghadas 1996
 Shabe Roobah (series) directed by Homayoon Asaadian 1996
 Tale Moosh (tele theater) directed by Hassan Fat'hi 1997
 Ghaziyeye Openhaymer (tele theater) directed by Mahmood  Azizi 1997
 Velayat Eshgh (series) directed by Mehdi Fakhimzade 1997
 Dar Mantagheye Jangi (tele theater) directed by Esmaeel Shangale 1997
 Mohreha (series) directed by Mohamad Banee
 Aparteman Faraj Va Farokh (series) directed by Asghar Farhadi 1998
 Cheshm Be Rah (series) directed by Asghar Farhadi 1998
 Estentagh (tele theater) directed by Farhad Mohandes Poor 1998
 Rostam o Sohrab (series) directed by Rasool Najfian 1999
 Zire Poodre Grim (series) directed by Babak Mohamadi 1999
 Rostam (series) directed by Babak Mohamadi 1999
 Mosfere Rey (series) directed by Davood Mir-Bagheri 2000
 Reign of Love (TV series) directed by Mehdi Fakhimzadeh
 Sedayam Kon (series) directed by Masood Navabi 2000
 Cheragh Jadoo (series) directed by Homayoon Asaadian 2000
 Neyestan (series) directed by Hosein Mokhtari 2000
 Khaste Nabashid (series) directed by Ali Shoghian 2001
 Dardesarhaye Talai (series) directed by Shapoor Ghareeb 2001
 Shahe Khamoosh (series) directed by Homayoon Shahnavaz 2002
 Yoonanian (tele theater) directed by Hosein Lale 2003
 Bachehaye Khiyaban (series) directed by Homayoon Asaadian 2003
 Caligula by Albert Camus (tele theater) directed by Ghotbeddin Sadeghi 2003
 L'engrenage (The Gear) (Charkhdande) by Jean-Paul Sartre (tele theater) directed by Ghotbeddin Sadeghi 2005
 Ta Ghoroob (series) directed by Mohammad Banaee 2004
 Payan Namayesh (series) directed by Bahman Zarin Poor  2005
 Shahzadeye Shahre Alan (series) directed by Hosein Mokhtary 2005
 Yek Mosht Pare Oghab (series) directed by Asghar Hashemi 2005
 Roozhaye Siahtar Az shab (series) directed by Kazem Baloochi 2006
 Jadye Aseman (tele film) directed by Kambiz Kashefi 2007
 Akhare Bazi (End of Game) (tele film) directed by Kazem Masoomi 2010
 Bachehaye Behesht (series) directed by Khosro Masoomi (post-production)
 Mokhtarname (series) directed by Davood MirBagheri (post-production)
 Emperatoore Koshtar by Yasmina Reza directed by Alireza Koushk Jalali 2010
 Tavan by Arash Borhani (series) directed by shahram shah hoseini 2010
Mortal Wound (home video series) directed by Mohammad Hossein Mahdavian 2021

Bibliography
 Comedy Theatre  (single curtain drama), 1977
 Susangerd  (single curtain drama), 1979
 Kif (Bag'') (short story collection), 1980

References

External links

 
  alijalaly-ensemble.de

 iranianfilmactors.ir
 irantheater.ir
 irib.com
 Iranian Film Industry Who's Who

1950 births
Living people
People from Tehran
Male actors from Tehran
Iranian male film actors
Iranian male stage actors
Iranian male television actors
20th-century Iranian male actors
21st-century Iranian male actors